James Sutherland Thomson  (April 30, 1892 – November 18, 1972) was a Canadian academic and Christian minister, a president of the University of Saskatchewan, and the 17th Moderator of the United Church of Canada.

Biography
Born in Stirling, Scotland, Thomson was educated at the University of Glasgow. He studied theology at Trinity College, Glasgow, and was ordained in the Church of Scotland in 1920. Upon moving to Canada in 1930, he accepted an appointment as professor of systematic theology and philosophy of religion at Pine Hill Divinity Hall (now part of the Atlantic School of Theology) in Halifax, Nova Scotia. From 1937 to 1949, he was the second president of the University of Saskatchewan. During World War II, he was general manager of the Canadian Broadcasting Corporation from 1942 to 1943.

In 1949, he became dean of the newly formed Faculty of Divinity at McGill University and also served there as professor of religious studies. He retired as dean in 1957. From 1956 to 1958, he served as Moderator of the United Church of Canada, elected by the 17th General Council at their meeting in Windsor, Ontario. 
He was made a Fellow of the Royal Society of Canada in 1942.

References

1892 births
1972 deaths
Canadian university and college faculty deans
Fellows of the Royal Society of Canada
Moderators of the United Church of Canada
People from Stirling
Presidents of the University of Saskatchewan
Scottish emigrants to Canada
Ministers of the United Church of Canada